Grennan may refer to:

 Grennan, a surname (with a list of people surnamed Grennan) 
 Grennan Hill, Scotland
 Thomastown, County Kilkenny, Ireland, originally named Grennan